"There for You" is a song by English production duo Gorgon City and American DJ MK, released as a single on 16 August 2019. It reached number one on the US Billboard Dance Club Songs chart.

Critical reception
Writing for Dancing Astronaut, Harry Levin called the "lyrical message [...] typical and formulaic", but said that both Gorgon City and MK "rarely deviate from simple themes because they always deliver them in fine style". He also complimented the "piano rhythms" as "smooth rather than foreboding", the "vocal harmonies" as "uplifting and serene" and the drums as "tight and succinct". Vivian Lin of Earmilk wrote that the track features "MK's signature piano melodies and [is] laced with Gorgon City's intrinsic uplifting dispositions" and that it contains "classic house traits as the track effortlessly glides over stirring soundscapes". The cover artwork was designed by Samuel Muir Studio.

Track listing

Charts

Weekly charts

Year-end charts

Certifications

References

2019 singles
2019 songs
Gorgon City songs
MK (DJ) songs
Songs written by Marc Kinchen
Virgin EMI Records singles